Iridopsis humaria, the small purplish gray, is a species of geometrid moth in the family Geometridae.

The MONA or Hodges number for Iridopsis humaria is 6584.

References

Further reading

External links

 

Boarmiini
Articles created by Qbugbot
Moths described in 1858